Vitranc Cup (Slovenian: Pokal Vitranc) is an annual FIS Alpine Ski World Cup competition, held since 1961 in Kranjska Gora, Upper Carniola, Slovenia.

Giant slalom at Kranjska Gora is considered as one of three most prestigious and challenging in the world, next to those in Adelboden and Alta Badia.

This competition is the successor of "Bukovniški smuk" (Bukovnik Downhill), "kamikaze dowhnill" race first held in Kranjska Gora in 1949.

History

1961: First edition 
On 4 March 1961 first ever Vitranc Cup event was held with extremely demanding and steep giant slalom course from top of the Vitranc mountain, also known as "hara-kiri with accelaration".

1962: Event not scheduled at all 
In 1962, for the only time in history, the competition was not on schedule at all, because Yugoslavian Ski Federation office in Belgrade, simply forgot to send the application to International Ski Federation (FIS).

1968: World Cup debut 
On 10 March 1968, Vitranc Cup (Kranjska Gora) hosted first ever World Cup alpine ski event in Slovenia (also Yugoslavia at the same time). Slalom won by French skier Patrick Russel.

1982: Record attendance 
On 20 March 1982, Bojan Križaj took first World Cup win at home ground, in front of record crowd of 32,000 people, which hasn't been broken yet at alpine skiing events in Slovenia, beating Ingemar Stenmark.

1983: New permanent course opened 
On 29–30 January 1983, Vitranc Cup competition was last time held on old steep course above old gas station, before moving to then new and now permanent course in nearby Podkoren, and still in use today.

On 1–2 December 1983, competition was first time held and permanently moved at the new "Podkoren 3" nearby course, constructed and designed by ex Slovenian skier Peter Lakota. Double slalom schedule for both, first women competition and the next day for men. It was the first and the last time in history, that Slovenia hosted World Cup opening, for both men and women. This was the first and only time that women competed for Vitranc Cup.

1985: Petrovič won infront home crowd 
On 21 December 1985, Rok Petrovič celebrated 2nd of all his five World Cup career wins in his career, dominating this season, in front of home crowd of 30,000 people.

1986: Double Slovenian win 
On 20 December 1986, then Slovenian sports icons Bojan Križaj and Petrovič took double Slovenian win, beating 3rd placed Ingemar Stenmark.

Vitranc Cup Top 3 results

Men

Women 
In start of the season, they exceptionally and once in history of this competition, raced for "Vitranc Cup".

Substitute events
Kranjska Gora replaced 6 men's cancelled events from other countries, which didn't count for Vitranc Cup:

4 Mar 2016 – Henrik Kristoffersen won Friday's additional giant slalom, instead of Garmisch-Partenkirchen (GER). 
29 Jan 2010 – Ted Ligety won Friday's additional giant slalom, instead of Adelboden (SUI). 
20 Dec 2001 – Fredrik Nyberg won Friday's additional giant slalom, instead of Aspen (USA).
8 Mar 2000 – Christian Mayer won extra giant slalom, instead of Adelboden (SUI).
6 Jan 1990 – Jonas Nilsson won Saturday's additional slalom, instead of Madonna di Campiglio (ITA).
3 Jan 1986 – Joël Gaspoz won extra giant slalom, instead of Borovets (BUL).

Multiple winners
With at least two wins or more.

Club5+ 
In 1986, elite Club5 was originally founded by prestigious classic downhill organizers: Kitzbühel, Wengen, Garmisch, Val d’Isère and Val Gardena/Gröden, with goal to bring alpine ski sport on the highest levels possible.

Later over the years other classic longterm organizers joined the now named Club5+: Alta Badia, Cortina, Kranjska Gora, Maribor, Lake Louise, Schladming, Adelboden, Kvitfjell, St.Moritz and Åre.

References

External links
 

Alpine skiing competitions
1961 establishments in Slovenia
Alpine skiing in Slovenia
Recurring sporting events established in 1961

de:Vitranc-Pokal
sl:Pokal Vitranc